Camp Tamarack may be:

Camp Tamarack, California
Camp Tamarack, Indiana
Camp Tamarack, New Jersey
Camp Tamarack (Oregon)

See also
Tamarack (disambiguation)